Coleophora echinacea is a moth of the family Coleophoridae. It is found in Mongolia.

The larvae feed on Krascheniunnikovia eversmanniana. They feed on the generative organs of their host plant.

References

echinacea
Moths described in 1972
Moths of Asia